Thomas Thomason Perowne (1824–1913) was Archdeacon of Norwich from 1878 until 1910.

Perowne was born in 1824; educated at Corpus Christi College, Cambridge; and ordained in 1848. After curacies at St Michael, Cambridge and Holy Sepulchre, Cambridge he was Rector of Stalbridge then Redenhall with Harleston. He was also Examining Chaplain to successive Bishops of Norwich.

He died on 6 May 1913; his son was Thomas Perowne (1886-1954).

Family tree

References

1824 births
1913 deaths
19th-century English Anglican priests
20th-century English Anglican priests
Archdeacons of Norwich
Alumni of Corpus Christi College, Cambridge